Football Manager 2009 (abbreviated to Football Manager 09 or FM09) is a football manager simulation video game. It was released on PC, Mac and PlayStation Portable on 14 November 2008 in Europe and on 18 November 2008 in North America. As in the case of other recent releases in the Football Manager series, the game is sold as Worldwide Soccer Manager 2009 in the United States and Canada.

The demo of the game was released on 2 November via the News of the World, BitTorrent, and Steam. An Arsenal-branded version of the game has also been released.

Gameplay
FM09 features similar gameplay to that of the Football Manager series. Gameplay consists of taking charge of a professional association football team, as the team manager. Players can sign football players to contracts, manage finances for the club, and give team talks to players. FM09 is a simulation of real world management, with the player being judged on various factors by the club's AI owners and board.

Some of the new features and box art for the game were announced via a series of videos on 3 September 2008, other new features have been released via a series of podcasts and online blogs. It is the first game in the series to be released on DVD-ROM rather than on CD-ROM.

The main new feature to the game is the 3D match engine. This can now be watched fullscreen, with a widescreen option available. Other features include being able to play as a female or male manager, improvements to the interaction between the manager and his assistant manager, improved mid-match team talks and tactics, training players to have preferred moves and transfer rumours. There will also be press conferences, where you can build up a rapport with the journalists, and the finance and transfer systems have been completely reworked. The game is set to feature more players than ever before, with over 350,000 in the database at the time of the game's announcement. The PC version has a skin similar to the one used in Football Manager 2008.

The handheld version will include a 2D match engine for the first time, and the game will be shipped with two skins; a light and a dark alternative.

The game suffered setbacks on and before launch day, most notably many users found themselves unable to activate the game due to servers providing activation for the DRM system coming under distributed denial of service attacks.

Controversy
On release, many buyers had problems with the game's copy protection. A printing error on the manuals caused the keys to be difficult to read and there were distributed denial of service attacks on the Uniloc activation servers that prevented purchasers from activating their games. Since the provided telephone activation lines were also run using the activation servers, they were also out of action. In response, SEGA issued a press release apologising for the problems faced by purchasers. As of May 2011, the game can no longer be activated as the website that deals with product activation of Football Manager 2009 has shut down.

Reception

Football Manager 2009 computer version received a "Platinum" sales award from the Entertainment and Leisure Software Publishers Association (ELSPA), indicating sales of at least 300,000 copies in the United Kingdom. Studio director Miles Jacobson stated that "for every one person that bought Football Manager 2009 there were four who pirated it."

Notes

References

External links
 

2008 video games
2009
Games for Windows certified games
MacOS games
PlayStation Portable games
Video games developed in the United Kingdom
Windows games
Multiplayer and single-player video games